Khalid Iqbal (23 June 1929  19 June 2014) was a Pakistani painter, art teacher and professor emeritus, appears known for landscape paintings as well as his natural forms paintings 
and portraits of Punjab, Pakistan. 

The recipient of national awards such as the Pride of Performance and Tamgha-e-Quaid-e-Azam, he is sometimes referred to in the Pakistani media as "father of landscape painting".

Biography 
He was born on 23 June 1929 in British India (in modern-day Simla, India). He attended St Joseph's Academy, Dehradun where he obtained his O levels education. In 1949, he obtained bachelor's degree from Forman Christian College, and diploma in French in 1952 from the Oriental College. He took art classes in the evening at the Mayo School of Arts (now known as the National College of Arts). 

He later worked as an art teacher at Aitchison College from 1949 to 1952, and subsequently went to England and attended Slade School of Fine Art to study fine arts from 1952 to 1955. 

Later in 1956, he served as a lecturer at University of Punjab for Fine Arts Department.

He had also served as principal of National College of Arts (NCA), Lahore following the removal of Shakir Ali, for 15 years till 1980. In 1993, he was also honored with the Chair of Professor Emeritus at the National College of Arts.

Awards and recognition
Tamgha-e-Quaid-e-Azam (Medal of Quaid-e-Azam) by the Government of Pakistan for his contributions to painting in 1977.
 Pride of Performance Award by the President of Pakistan in 1980.

Death and legacy
He suffered health complications and was subsequently admitted to the Ittefaq Hospital, Lahore and died of pneumonia at Model Town, Lahore on 14 June 2014.

His funeral was attended by some of his pupils and fellow painters including Nayyar Ali Dada, Saeed Akhtar, Ajaz Anwar and noted Pakistani news media personality Mustansar Hussain Tarar.

Bibliography

References 

1929 births
2014 deaths
20th-century Pakistani painters
Artists from Lahore
Pakistani educators
Forman Christian College alumni
Recipients of the Pride of Performance
Recipients of Tamgha-e-Quaid-e-Azam